Aepycamelus is an extinct genus of camelids that lived during the Miocene 20.6–4.9 million years ago, existing for about . Its name is derived from the Homeric Greek , "high and steep" and κάμηλος – "camel"; thus, "high camel"; alticamelus in Latin.

Aepycamelus spp. walked on their toes only. Unlike earlier species of camelids, they possessed cushioned pads like those of modern camels.

Taxonomy
Aepycamelus was formerly referred to the genus Alticamelus, which Matthew (1901) erected for "Procamelus" altus Marsh, 1894, a camel species described from a calcaneum found in Neogene deposits in Oregon, after he referred a complete skeleton of a tall camel from Colorado to that species. Matthew and Cook (1909) erected Alticamelus giraffinus for the Colorado specimen after recognizing the A. altus holotype as indeterminate. MacDonald (1956) recognized Alticamelus as a nomen dubium and erected Aepycamelus for species previously assigned to Alticamelus.

Morphology
 
Aepycamelus was a prairie dweller of North America (Colorado, etc.). It was a highly specialized animal. Its head was relatively small compared with the rest of its body, its neck was long, as a result of giraffe-like lengthening of the cervical vertebrae, and its legs were long and stilt-like, with the elbow and knee joints on the same level.

Its strange body structure gives information on its mode of life and habits. Aepycamelus obviously inhabited dry grasslands with groups of trees. It is presumed to have moved about singly or in small groups, like today's giraffes, and like them, browsed high up in the trees. In this respect, it had no competitors. It survived a relatively long time, through most of the Miocene epoch, and died out prior to the start of the Pliocene, possibly due to climatic changes.

Fossil distribution
Its fossils are distributed widely, from Montana to Florida to California.

References

Further reading
 Benes, Josef. Prehistoric Animals and Plants. Pg. 248. Prague: Artua, 1979.

Prehistoric camelids
Prehistoric even-toed ungulate genera
Miocene even-toed ungulates
Miocene mammals of North America
Fossil taxa described in 1956